Music from the Home Front is a live album recorded by various Australian and New Zealand artists, released on 19 June 2020 through Bloodlines. The album features performances from the live concert of the same name.

Background
The album is a recording of the live concert of the same name, which was held across Australia and New Zealand on 25 April 2020 to pay tribute to the Australian and New Zealand Army Corps (ANZACs) and health workers at the frontline of the response to the COVID-19 pandemic.

Discussing the album in a press release, Mushroom Group founder and record label executive Michael Gudinski said: "I am so proud of the results, humbled by the reaction to our incredible musical talent, and now so pleased to bring you this album to commemorate that special night."

Release
Michel Gudinski announced the release of Music from the Home Front on 29 May 2020.

The album was released on 19 June 2020  through Bloodlines and Universal Music, on 2×CD, digital download, and streaming.

The album received a limited edition 3×LP release on 4 September 2020. Each copy was individually numbered.

Track listing

Charts

Weekly charts

Year-end charts

See also
 List of number-one albums of 2020 (Australia)

Release history

References

2020 live albums
Bloodlines (record label) live albums
New Zealand music
Australian music
ANZAC